Jordan Lewis Jones (born 24 October 1994) is a professional footballer who plays as a winger for  Kilmarnock, on loan from Wigan Athletic, and the Northern Ireland national team.

Jones has previously played for Middlesbrough, Hartlepool United, Cambridge United, Rangers, Sunderland, St Mirren and Kilmarnock. He has also played for the Northern Ireland national team, having made his full international debut in 2017.

Club career
Jones started as a youth player with his home-town club Middlesbrough. He made one appearance for the Middlesbrough first team, in a 2012–13 FA Cup tie against Hastings United.

Jones was loaned to Hartlepool United in February 2015 and Cambridge United in November 2015. He was released by Middlesbrough at the end of the 2015–16 season.

Jones signed for Scottish Premiership club Kilmarnock in June 2016. In January 2018, Kilmarnock turned down an offer from Rangers to buy Jones for a reported £350,000 transfer fee. However, in January 2019 he signed a pre-contract agreement to join Rangers at the end of the 2018–19 season, and immediately tweeted a message expressing his delight at the "dream move" to the Glasgow club, which annoyed many Kilmarnock supporters as he would still be representing their team for several months, and only a point separated his current and future employers at the top of the league table. Jones later admitted he had been "over-excited" in sending the message, while Killie manager Steve Clarke defended the player and confirmed he would have no hesitation in playing him while he remained with the Ayrshire club. That backing was rewarded when Jones scored the winning goal in the next league fixture at Rugby Park, against Rangers; the 2–1 result boosted Kilmarnock's title hopes while denting those of the Gers.

Rangers
In June 2019 Jones said he wanted to be a first-team player at Rangers. He made his competitive debut for the club on 9 July 2019 in a 4–0 win over St Joseph's of Gibraltar in the 2019–20 UEFA Europa League.

Jones scored his first Rangers goal on 27 September 2020 against Motherwell at Fir Park, the second in a 5–1 win. On 2 November 2020 it was announced that Jones and George Edmundson had been suspended by Rangers, pending an internal investigation, for attending a party and breaching COVID-19 regulations.

On 29 January 2021, Jones joined English club Sunderland on loan for the remainder of the 2020–21 season. He scored his first goal for Sunderland on 27 February 2021 in a 2–2 draw against Crewe Alexandra.

Wigan Athletic
On 4 August 2021, Wigan Athletic signed Jones from Rangers on a three-year deal.

On 31 January 2022, Jones signed for St Mirren on loan until the end of the 2021–22 season. He was then loaned to Kilmarnock in July 2022. Wigan tried to recall him from the loan on 31 January 2023, but did not submit the paperwork before the deadline.

International career
Though born in England, Jones is able to represent Northern Ireland through his Northern Irish father. Aged 17, he represented their U19 team but turned down an opportunity to be part of the U21 squad.

In September 2017, he was called up to the senior Northern Ireland squad for 2018 FIFA World Cup qualifiers against Germany and Norway, but did not play in either game. He won his first senior cap for Northern Ireland in the 2018 World Cup Qualifying play-off second leg on 12 November 2017, coming on as a substitute, replacing Jamie Ward.

Career statistics

Club

International

Scores and results list Northern Ireland's goal tally first.

References

External links

Living people
1994 births
Footballers from Middlesbrough
Northern Ireland international footballers
Northern Ireland youth international footballers
English footballers
English people of Northern Ireland descent
Middlesbrough F.C. players
Hartlepool United F.C. players
Cambridge United F.C. players
Kilmarnock F.C. players
Rangers F.C. players
Sunderland A.F.C. players
St Mirren F.C. players
English Football League players
Scottish Professional Football League players
Association football wingers